Viktor Nikolayevich Dmitrenko (born 4 April 1991) is a professional footballer who plays as a defender for FC Atyrau in the Kazakhstan Premier League. Although primarily playing as a centre-back, he plays occasionally as a right-back or left-back. Born in Russia, he represents the Kazakhstan national team.

Club career
He also played for FC Zimbru Chișinău for a short period of time as a loan from FC Kuban Krasnodar and left the club because of his university studies in Russia. He made his professional debut in the Russian First Division in 2008 for FC Kuban Krasnodar.

In January 2016, Dmitrenko signed for FC Tobol.

Career statistics

Club

International

Statistics accurate as of match played 10 October 2014

International goals
Scores and results list Kazakhstan's goal tally first.

Honours

Club
Astana
 Kazakhstan Premier League (1): 2014
 Kazakhstan Cup (1): 2012

References

External links
 
 
 

1991 births
People from Primorsko-Akhtarsky District
Living people
Russian footballers
FC Kuban Krasnodar players
FC Zimbru Chișinău players
FC Aktobe players
FC Astana players
FC Armavir players
FC Tobol players
FC Ordabasy players
FC Atyrau players
Kazakhstan Premier League players
Russian Premier League players
Russian expatriate footballers
Kazakhstani expatriate footballers
Expatriate footballers in Moldova
Russian expatriate sportspeople in Moldova
Kazakhstani expatriate sportspeople in Moldova
Kazakhstan international footballers
Kazakhstani footballers
Kazakhstani people of Russian descent
Association football defenders
Sportspeople from Krasnodar Krai